Philophthalmidae is a family of trematodes in the order Plagiorchiida.

Genera
Cloacitrema Yamaguti, 1935
Echinostephilla Lebour, 1909
Parorchis Nicoll, 1907
Philophthalmus Looss, 1899
Philophthalmus gralli Mathis & Leger, 1910
Philophthalmus lacrimosus Braun, 1902
Pittacium Szidat, 1939
Pygorchis Looss, 1899
Skrjabinovermis Belopolskaya, 1954

References

Plagiorchiida
Trematode families